The Battle of Heliopolis was an engagement that pitted the French Armée d'Orient under General Kléber against a British-supported Ottoman army at Heliopolis on 20 March 1800.

Background
Kléber engaged in negotiations with both the British and Ottomans, with the aim of honourably evacuating the remains of the French force from Egypt to take part in operations in Europe. An accord (the Convention of El Arish) was concluded on 23 January 1800 allowing such a return to France, but it proved impossible to apply due to internal dissensions among the British and the dithering of the Sultan, and so the conflict in Egypt restarted.

Kléber was betrayed by the British Admiral Keith, who did not respect the El Arich convention. He therefore restarted hostilities, for he refused to surrender. The British and the Ottomans believed the armée d'Orient was now too weak to resist them, and so Yussuf Pasha ordered Nassif Pasha to march on Cairo, where the local population obeyed his call to revolt against French rule.

Battle

The French advanced to Mataria, where they arrived on the morning of March 20 at 3 p.m. The French organized themselves into four square formations. The corners of the squares had artillery and grenadiers. The left wing of the French was commanded by General Jean Reynier, with his division including the Joseph Lagrange and Antoine Joseph Robin brigades, and the right wing by General Louis Friant, with his division made up by the Augustin Daniel Belliard and François-Xavier Donzelot brigades. Kleber called on Murad Bey to support his right wing with his Mamluk cavalry, as well. He mustered his Mamluks but deserted the French flank before the battle and did not participate in the fighting. Kléber commanded the center of the forces, in which Pierre Leclerc d'Ostein led the French light cavalry in the center of the forces.

Reynier's left wing struck directly against Mataria's Janissaries as Friant cut off their retreat route. The French cavalry, in turn, clashed with the Ottoman cavalry. In addition to the Turks, the Ottoman side had Mamluk cavalry. The Janissaries were defeated relatively quickly and the French began to move towards the main Ottoman forces in the direction of Heliopolis. In Heliopolis, the Ottomans were led by Nassif Pasha. The Ottomans launched an attack on the French, which proved disorganized. The attack caught fire with the French cannon fire and turned into an uncontrollable retreat. Eventually, the French also reached the Ottoman camp. The Ottoman army fled to Syria.

Consequences
The losses of the French in the battle of Heliopolis remained very small. There were only about 600 French casualties. There were about 9,000 casualties on the Ottoman side. Kléber had managed to save the seemingly desperate situation, at least for the time being. He was also able to quell the uprising that erupted in Cairo. The position of the French was further strengthened with Kléber's recruitment of local auxiliaries and his alliance with his former enemy Murad Bey. However, Kléber was assassinated later that year and his successor, Jacques-François Menou, was considered a much weaker leader.

Gallery

Notes

References 
 Alexandre Tchoudinov, La bataille d’Héliopolis, ou la victoire oubliée in Napoleonica, Fondation Napoléon, n 3, 2015, pp. 5–47.

External links

1800 in Egypt
Battles involving the Ottoman Empire
Battles involving France
Battles of the French Revolutionary Wars
Conflicts in 1800
French campaign in Egypt and Syria
Battles inscribed on the Arc de Triomphe